Stokes equation may refer to:

 the Airy equation
 the equations of Stokes flow, a linearised form of the Navier–Stokes equations in the limit of small Reynolds number
 Stokes law